IDEX can refer to several things, including:

International Defence Exhibition, a biannual arms and defense technology sales exhibition
IDEX Corporation, a publicly listed company that makes fluidics systems and specialty engineered products
Ideanomics, a publicly traded company that trades under the IDEX ticker symbol.
Idex ASA, a Norwegian biometrics company
 Independent Dual Extrusion, a 3D printing technology